The Kearl Oil Sands Project is an oil sands mine in the Athabasca Oil Sands region at the Kearl Lake area, about  north of Fort McMurray in Alberta, Canada. The project is being developed in three phases with the first phase completed mid-2013.

Project description
The development is an open-pit mining operation, which will be developed in three stages. It uses a froth treatment technology producing blended bitumen which will be transported to the Edmonton area by Enbridge's pipeline system.

At the first stage the development would involve capital spending of about  billion, with the final estimate being highly dependent on the final upgrading option selected. An engineering, procurement, and construction management contract for the first phase was awarded to AMEC while Fluor Corp. is responsible for the development of infrastructure and facilities.

The development is located on the following oil-sands leases:
Leases 6 and 87, in which Imperial holds 100 percent of the mining rights. Areas deemed suitable for surface mining are primarily in the western part of Lease 6 and the northwestern part of Lease 87 (Imperial Oil, ExxonMobil 2009–07).
Lease 36 and 31A, in which ExxonMobil Canada holds 100% of the mining rights.

Ownership
Imperial Oil Resources owns 70% of the project and ExxonMobil Canada Ltd. owns 30%.

Regulatory agencies
Energy Resources Conservation Board

Criticism
Sierra Legal launched legal action in Canadian federal courts to overturn the Department of Fisheries and Oceans regulatory approval (Ecojustice Canada 2007-03-30).  They said that the joint federal-Alberta regulatory panel "failed to do its job" when it gave conditional approval to the $7 billion Kearl open-pit mine.  They argued that a full environmental review must take place before the federal government decides whether the project should proceed.

After a joint federal-provincial panel reviewed and upheld the original decision, a key water permit was reinstated, pending approval from Imperial's board of directors. Delayed again in response to the 2008 fall in oil prices, Imperial Oil decided in May 2009 to proceed with the project, taking advantage of the soft local economy to cut costs.

The Alberta Federation of Labour criticised the plan's lack of an upgrader, as "that's where the real jobs are", referring to the intent to pipe diluted bitumen south for upgrading.

Residents of Idaho and Montana have criticized the plan to transport oversized loads of prefabricated parts of oil extraction "modules" over U.S. Route 12 along the narrow curving byways of the Clearwater and Lochsa River of the National Wild and Scenic Rivers System, over Lolo Pass, through Missoula, Montana, and into Alberta.

In March 2023, Imperial Oil received a Fisheries Act direction from Environment Canada to contain seepage from a tailings pond at the project. This seepage has been ruled harmful to wildlife. The spill had first been noticed in May 2022 but the required notification had not been given to federal regulators at the time.

Coronavirus outbreak 

On April 15, 2020, an outbreak of COVID-19 was linked to Kearl by the provincial government; by April 20, at least twenty cases have been attributed to the site by Alberta Health Services. On April 18, BC's Interior Health and the Saskatchewan Health Authority (in particular, residents of northwest Saskatchewan) issued advisories of self-isolation for staff returning from interprovincial travel to the region and their close contacts.

Kearl Module Transportation Project
Mammoet, a developer and user of Self Propelled Modular Transporters is using SPMTs (14 Line 16' Wide Goldhofer Hydraulic Platform Trailer)  in conjunction with Class 8 Tractors   to transport modules (deemed "oversized loads") of oil extraction parts on the "Kearl Module Transportation Project" from the port of Lewiston, Idaho, through the U.S. states of Idaho and Montana to the Kearl Oil Sands Project.

References

External links 
Kearl Boundary - Google Maps
Proposed module transport and required road and utility modifications

Athabasca oil sands
Oil fields of Alberta
ExxonMobil oil and gas fields
Regional Municipality of Wood Buffalo
Bituminous sands of Canada